{{Infobox writer 
| name = Vanessa Alexander
| image = 
| imagesize = 
| alt = 
| caption = 
| pseudonym = 
| birth_place = New York, U.S
| death_date = 
| death_place = 
| resting_place = 
| occupation = 
| language = English
| nationality = American
| ethnicity = 
| citizenship = Australian/New Zealand/British/American
| education = University of New South Wales
| alma_mater = 
| period = 
| genre = 
| subject = 
| movement = 
| notableworks = Vikings: ValhallaThe GreatTin StarThe Wrong GirlLove ChildAgent AnnaPower RangersBeing Eve
| spouse = 
| partner = 
| children = 
| influences = 
| influenced = 
| awards = 
| signature = 
| signature_alt = 
| website = 
| portaldisp = 
}}

Vanessa Alexander is an Australian, New Zealand and British screenwriter, director and producer best known for writing on Vikings: Valhalla and The Great.

Early life and education
Alexander was born in New York to a New Zealand father and English mother. She grew up in Laguna Beach, California before relocating to Oamaru, New Zealand in her teens. She was educated at Laguna Beach High School, Waitaki Girls' High School and the University of Otago, where she studied a Bachelor of Arts in English Literature. She also holds a post-graduate diploma in film directing from The Victorian College of the Arts and a Ph.D. in Creative Writing from The University of New South Wales.

Alexander lives in Newcastle, Australia, moving there in 2012 after living in Paris.

Career
Alexander began her career writing stage plays in New Zealand and almost left the industry to apply for medical school after receiving multiple rejections for short film funding. She won an international student playwriting contest in 1990 with a feminist reinterpretation of T.S. Eliot's poem The Waste Land, titled My Nightingale has Come Unzipped. Her first feature film Magik & Rose, which she wrote and directed at the age of 28, was produced by New Zealand director Larry Parr and funded by the New Zealand Film Commission under a low-budget film development scheme. The film was shot in New Zealand's South Island at the Hokitika Wildfoods Festival with a budget of $350,000 and was nominated for four New Zealand Film Awards. It also won a jury prize at the Oporto Film Festival in Portugal.

Alexander was a producer for Taika Waititi’s second short film Two Cars, One Night and has been a board member for the New Zealand Film Commission. Her first job in television was as a producer, writer and director for the New Zealand children television series Being Eve. The series was nominated for an International Emmy Award in the Children and Young People category.

Alexander wrote for the Netflix series Vikings: Valhalla and was also a writer for the comedy-drama television series The Great, which was nominated for numerous awards, including two Writers Guild of America awards for which Alexander was a listed nominee. She has written for the British-Canadian television series Tin Star and the Australian television series Love Child, The Secret Daughter and The Wrong Girl, for which she was nominated for an AWGIE Award. She directed the New Zealand television series Agent Anna.

On 21 January 2021, ViacomCBS International named Alexander as the lead writer for its development of a television series about the Italian baroque artist Artemisia Gentileschi. Titled "Artemisia", the series is also being produced by former ViacomCBS International Studios UK managing director Jill Offman and Pan's Labyrinth'' producer Frida Torresblanco, who said the development "will be a contemporary feminist piece that is at once provocative and transgressive, invoking the spirit of our present moment in an eloquent and elegant way”.

Filmography

Film

Television 
The numbers in directing and writing credits refer to the number of episodes.

References

External links

Australian television directors
Australian women film directors
Australian women film producers
Australian women screenwriters
Australian women television producers
Australian women television writers
British women screenwriters
British women television writers
Living people
New Zealand television directors
New Zealand television producers
New Zealand television writers
New Zealand women film directors
New Zealand women film producers
New Zealand women screenwriters
People educated at Waitaki Girls' High School
University of New South Wales alumni
University of Otago alumni
Year of birth missing (living people)
People from Oamaru
Australian women television directors
British women television directors